Van Dunem or Van-Dúnem is a surname. Notable people with the surname include:

Afonso Van-Dúnem M'Binda (1941-2014), Angolan politician
Fernando José de França Dias Van-Dúnem (born 1934), Angolan politician
Francisca Van Dunem (born 1955), Portuguese Minister of Justice
Maria de Lourdes Pereira dos Santos Van-Dúnem (1935–2006), Angolan singer
Neide Van-Dúnem (born 1986), Angolan singer and actress
Osvaldo de Jesus Serra Van-Dúnem (died 2006), Angolan diplomat and politician
Pedro de Castro van Dúnem  (1942–1997), Angolan diplomat and politician

See also
Pavilhão Serra Van-Dunem, an indoor arena in Angola

Surnames of Dutch origin